Prostanthera ammophila, commonly known as sand mintbush, is a species of flowering plant in the family Lamiaceae and is endemic to southern areas of South Australia. It is an erect to spreading shrub with egg-shaped to narrow elliptical leaves and white and purple to mauve flowers with yellow spots inside.

Description

Taxonomy
Prostanthera ammophila was first formally described in 1988 by Barry Conn in the journal Nuytsia from specimens collected near Yardea Station in 1969.

Etymology 
The species epithet, ammophila, is derived from the Greek: ammos (sand), and philos (loving) to give the adjective: ammophilus,-a,-um, which describes the plant as "sand-loving or as  "growing in sandy soil.

Distribution and habitat
This mintbush grows on sand dunes and on rocky hills in the Gawler Ranges and Eyre Peninsula in South Australia.

References

ammophila
Flora of South Australia
Lamiales of Australia
Taxa named by Barry John Conn
Plants described in 1988